Richie Vaculik (born Richard Vaculik) is a mixed martial artist and big wave surfer from Maroubra, Australia. Richie competed in the Ultimate Fighting Championship (UFC) Flyweight division.

Early life
Richie's sporting accomplishments started as a surfer at Maroubra Beach, Sydney (Australia). Bra Boys including the Abberton brothers (Sunny Abberton, Koby Abberton, Jai Abberton and Dakota Abberton), Mark Mathews and Richie grew up surfing the iconic Maroubra Beach breaks and other waves including 'Ours'.

In an interview with Surfing Magazine Richie stated that as teenagers he and some Bra Boys would fight each other for fun or to resolve disputes. Richie was introduced to Brazilian jiu-jitsu by blackbelt Bruno Panno at the age of 18.

Mixed martial arts career

Early career
In November 2006 Richie made a successful MMA debut at Warriors Realm 7 against Michael Mortimer, winning via first-round knockout.

Cage Fighting Championship
Richie remained undefeated before challenging Gustavo Falciroli for the Cage Fighting Championship (CFC) inaugural bantamweight title at CFC 12, in March 2010, at the Hordern Pavilion. Falciroli defeated Richie via unanimous 5-round decision.

Proud Warriors Productions, Australian Fighting Championship and Combat8
Since 2011 Richie has exclusively fought international competition. At Proud Warriors Productions (PWP) 3, September 2011, Richie defeated Hawaiian Justin Wong via first round submission. In February 2012, Richie defeated American Nick Honstein for the inaugural featherweight belt at PWP 4: Vaculik vs Honstein, via first round submission.

At Australian Fighting Championship (AFC) 3, April 2012, Richie defeated American MMA veteran Matt Jaggers via first-round knockout.

Richie also defeated American Charlie Alaniz, via split decision (5 rounds), to capture the Combat8 bantamweight title in mid 2013 in a modified MMA rules event broadcast live via epicentre.tv and delayed broadcast on Fox Sports.

Ultimate Fighting Championship
In June 2012, Richie was cast on The Ultimate Fighter: The Smashes (TUF Smashes). Richie fought twice at lightweight, he was outsized and defeated by Norman Parke via unanimous decision (2 rounds) and Colin Fletcher via second round submission.

In December 2013, Richie made his UFC and flyweight debut on the undercard at UFC Fight Night: Hunt vs. Bigfoot against Justin Scoggins and was defeated via first-round TKO. In an interview with MMA Kanvas Richie stated he was surprised by Scoggin's wrestling based game plan.

Vaculik was set to face Jon delos Reyes on the undercard at UFC Fight Night: Te Huna vs. Marquardt on 8 June 2014. Reyes was replaced by Philippines' Roldan Sangcha'an. Vaculik he defeated Sangcha-an via unanimous decision.

Vaculik was expected to face Ray Borg on 8 November 2014 at UFC Fight Night 55. However, Borg was unavailable and Neil Seery was officially announced as Richie's opponent. Subsequently, Seery pulled out of that bout as well and was replaced by Louis Smolka. Despite winning the first and second rounds, Vaculik lost the fight via TKO in the third round.

Vaculik faced Danny Martinez on 15 November 2015 at UFC 193. He lost the fight via unanimous decision and was subsequently cut from the UFC in 2016.

Film and television
Richie features in Bra Boys: Blood is Thicker than Water. Macario De Souza directed friends Mark Matthews and Richie in the follow up documentary Fighting Fear. On The Ultimate Fighter: The Smashes, Richie represented Australia for the first time inside the UFC octagon. The Crew is a successful television series that follows on from Fighting Fear documenting Richie's career in MMA and surfing on Fuel TV.

The three friends Richie, De Souza and Mathews were the subject of an Australian Story episode Scared Straight (2011) where Sue Masters looks into their maturation as professionals in their respective careers and some of the trails and tribulations of getting there.

According to The Daily Telegraph Vas is set to co-anchor a UFC Tonight style show for Fox Sports on Australian pay television network Foxtel alongside Tara Rushton called UFC Fight Week that  premiered on Thursday, 16 April 2015.

Big wave surfing
Richie has surfed some of the world's most dangerous breaks including The Right and Shipsterns Bluff (Australia), Hawaii and Teahupo'o (Tahiti). Surfing since the age of 10, he credits the older surfers who pushed him to ride waves out of his comfort zone from an early age. Bra Boys pioneered standup surfing at a local Sydney break called Cape Fear, on the southern side of the Botany Bay at Cape Solander. Known locally as 'Ours', it became the site of a Red Bull big wave surfing competition in August 2014 called Red Bull Cape Fear. Richie competed against fellow local Evan Faulks.

Championships and accomplishments
Cage Fighting Championship
CFC Bantamweight title
Combat8
Combat8 Bantamweight title
Proud Warriors Productions
PWP Featherweight title

Mixed martial arts record

-
|Loss
|align=center|10–5
|Nobuki Fujii
|Submission (rear-naked choke)
|Pancrase 289
|
|align=center| 1
|align=center| 3:42
|Tokyo, Japan
| 
|-
|Loss
|align=center|10–4
|Danny Martinez
|Decision (unanimous)
|UFC 193
|
|align=center| 3
|align=center| 5:00
|Melbourne, Australia
| 
|-
|Loss
|align=center|10–3
|Louis Smolka
|KO (side kick and punches)
|UFC Fight Night: Rockhold vs. Bisping
|
|align=center|3
|align=center|0:18
|Sydney
|
|-
|Win
|align=center|10–2
|Roldan Sangcha-an
| Decision (unanimous)
|UFC Fight Night: Te-Huna vs. Marquardt
|
|align=center|3
|align=center|5:00
|Auckland, New Zealand
|
|-
|Loss
|align=center|9–2
|Justin Scoggins
| TKO (punches)
|UFC Fight Night: Hunt vs. Bigfoot
|
|align=center|1
|align=center|4:43
|Brisbane, Australia
|
|-
|Win
|align=center|9–1
|Matt Jaggers
| TKO (punches)
|AFC 3 – Australian Fighting Championship 3
|
|align=center|1
|align=center|0:41
|Melbourne, Australia
|
|-
|Win
|align=center|8–1
|Nick Honstein
| Submission (triangle armbar)
|PWP 4 – Vaculik vs. Honstein
|
|align=center|1
|align=center|0:59
|Sydney
|
|-
|Win
|align=center|7–1
|Justin Wong
| Submission (rear-naked choke)
|PWP 3 – Proud Warrior Productions 3
|
|align=center|1
|align=center|5:00
|Sydney
|
|-
|Win
|align=center|6–1
|Glenn Taylor-Smith
| Submission (rear-naked choke)
|Impact FC 2 – The Uprising: Sydney
|
|align=center|2
|align=center|2:43
|Sydney
|
|-
|Win
|align=center|5–1
|Evan Byrne
| Submission (rear-naked choke)
|CFC – Cage Fighting Championships 14
|
|align=center|1
|align=center|5:00
|Sydney
|
|-
|Loss
|align=center|4–1
|Gustavo Falciroli
|Decision (unanimous)
|CFC 12 – Lombard vs. Santore
|
|align=center|5
|align=center|5:00
|Sydney
|
|-
|Win
|align=center|4–0
|Michael Mortimer
|Submission (rear-naked choke)
|CFC 9 – Fighters Paradise
|
|align=center|1
|align=center|4:35
|Gold Coast, Australia
|
|-
|Win
|align=center|3–0
|Ross MacLeod
|KO (punch)
|CFC 7 – Battle at the Big Top
|
|align=center|1
|align=center|1:59
|Sydney
|
|-
|Win
|align=center|2–0
|Alexandre Shevtsov
|Submission (rear-naked choke)
|Warriors Realm 8
|
|align=center|2
|align=center|2:24
|Sydney
|
|-
|Win
|align=center|1–0
|Michael Mortimer
|KO (punch)
|Warriors Realm 7
|
|align=center|1
|align=center|1:36
|Sydney
|

See also

 The Crew
 Fighting Fear
 Bra Boys: Blood is Thicker than Water
 List of current UFC fighters
 List of male mixed martial artists

References

External links
 
 
 
 
 

1983 births
Living people
Australian male mixed martial artists
Lightweight mixed martial artists
Mixed martial artists utilizing Greco-Roman wrestling
Mixed martial artists utilizing Brazilian jiu-jitsu
Australian practitioners of Brazilian jiu-jitsu
Bantamweight mixed martial artists
Australian surfers
Sportsmen from New South Wales
Flyweight mixed martial artists
Sportspeople from Sydney
Ultimate Fighting Championship male fighters